Arnöhuvud Nature Reserve is a nature reserve in Uppsala County, Sweden.

The nature reserve protects a forested and relatively high peninsula in Lake Mälaren, part of a much longer ridge. It is covered with old-growth forest consisting mainly of Norway spruce and Scots pine. The rich fauna includes hare, roe deer, pheasants and several types of marine birds. The nature reserve furthermore contains several cairns dating from the Bronze Age. The nature reserve is part of the EU-wide Natura 2000 network.

References

Nature reserves in Sweden
Geography of Uppsala County